Ziya Musa oglu Bunyadov ( sometimes spelled in English as Zia Buniatov or Bunyatov) (21 December 1923, Astara – 21 February 1997, Baku) was an Azerbaijani historian, academician, and Vice-President of the National Academy of Sciences of Azerbaijan. As a historian, he also headed the Institute of History of the Azerbaijani Academy of Sciences for many years. Bunyadov was a World War II veteran and Hero of the Soviet Union.

Life

Ziya Bunyadov was born on 21 December 1923 in the town of Astara in Azerbaijan. His father, originally from Bibiheybat village of Baku, was a customs officer and, due to his work, the Bunyadov family changed their residence several times.  After finishing secondary school in Goychay in 1939, he joined Baku Military School. In 1942 he was sent to World War II to fight on the Caucasus Front, near the town of Mozdok. Krasnaya Zvezda (Red Star), the official newspaper of the Soviet Army, wrote about Bunyadov in 1942: "sly, swift as a tiger, the intelligence officer Ziya Bunyadov, who under improbable conditions, in the most complex situation could clearly orient himself, bring precise data about the number, armament and location of the enemy. He was valued in the battalion for his romantic soul and literary erudition" . He went on to fight on the European Front and participated in the Soviet capture of Warsaw and Berlin.

Ziya Bunyadov was awarded the Soviet Union's highest military honor, Hero of the Soviet Union, for his actions in the battle over a bridge on Pilica river in Poland on 14 January 1945, resulting in 100 enemy fatalities and 45 enemy prisoners taken. As well as this medal, for his participation and heroism in World War II Bunyadov was also awarded the honors Red Banner, Red Star, Alexander Nevsky, and 2nd degree Patriotic War. For a year after the end of war, he was deputy military commandant of the Pankow district of Berlin.

Academic career
After the war, Bunyadov graduated from the Moscow Institute of Oriental Studies and in 1954 defended his doctorate dissertation. He returned to Baku and started working at the Institute of History of the Academy of Sciences of the Azerbaijan SSR. Here he progressed from the position of research associate to chief scientist, head of the Institute of History, corresponding member of the Academy of Sciences and then finally full academician and vice-president of the Academy of Sciences. He was the author and editor of numerous monographs, books, and articles on the history of Caucasus.

Soviet orientalist and journalist Farid Seyful-Mulukov noted regarding Bunyadov's translation of the Quran: "He was an outstanding scholar. Quran translation requires excellent knowledge of the Arabic language and few dare to embark upon that job. Ziya Bunyadov managed to do excellent translation of the Holy Book."

Death

On 21 February 1997 Bunyadov was murdered at the entrance to his apartment in Baku. Though the official state investigation placed the responsibility on a group of Islamic extremists, many of whom received life sentences, the culprits and circumstances of Bunyadov's murder remained mysterious. According to John W. Parker, chief of the Division for Caucasus and Central Asia within the U.S. State Department, Bunyadov's murderers were trained in Iran. He was buried at the Alley of Honor.

Critics
Bunyadov researched ancient and medieval Azerbaijani historiography, specializing in Caucasian Albania and Azerbaijan during the Arab caliphate rule, concentrating on events from the 7th19th centuries AD. In different areas, Bunyadov's work has met severe criticism. According to journalist Thomas de Waal:
"Buniatov's academy reissued thirty thousand copies of a forgotten racist tract by the turn of the century Russian polemicist Vasil Velichko; later Buniatov began a poisonous quarrel for which Caucasian Albanians themselves should take none of them blame. Buniatov’s scholarly credentials were dubious. It later transpired that the two articles he published in 1960 and 1965 on Caucasian Albania were direct plagiarism. Under his own name, he had simply published, unattributed, translations of two articles, originally written in English by Western scholars C.F.J. Dowsett and Robert Hewsen."

Bunyadov is also known for his article, "Why Sumgait?", on the 1988 ethnic riots in the town of Sumgait. Thomas de Waal calls Bunyadov "Azerbaijan’s foremost Armenophobe," and says, "Buniatov concluded that the Sumgait pogroms had been planned by the Armenians themselves in order to discredit Azerbaijan and boost the Armenian nationalist cause." (see Sumgait pogrom#Conspiracy theories).

According to Russian historian Victor Schnirelmann, Bunyadov "purposefully tried 'to clear' the territories of modern Azerbaijan from the presence of Armenian history". "Another way is to underestimate the presence of Armenians in ancient and medieval Transcaucasia and to belittle their role by reprinting antique and medieval sources with denominations and replacements of the 'Armenian state' term to 'the Albanian state' or with other distortions of original texts. In the 1960s to 1990s there were many such reprintings of primary sources in Baku, where academician Z.M. Bunyadov was actively engaged".

Soviet academic Igor Diakonov wrote that Bunyadov become infamous for a scientific edition of "a historical source from where all mentions on Armenians have been carefully eliminated".

Historians Willem Floor and Hasan Javadi charged Bunyadov for making "an incomplete and defective Russian translation of Bakikhanov's text. Not only has he not translated any of the poems in the text, but he does not even mention that he has not done so, while he does not translate certain other prose parts of the text without indicating this and why. This is in particular disturbing because he suppresses, for example, the mention of territory inhabited by Armenians, thus not only falsifying history, but also not respecting Bakikhanov's dictum that a historian should write without prejudice, whether religious, ethnic, political or otherwise".

Some of Bunyadov's research is discussed by Western journalist and author Yo'av Karny.

As part of the Soviet Union's nation-building efforts, the Iranian Babak Khorramdin, who followed the teaching of the Iranian Zoroastrian priest Mazdak with its pseudo-Communist and socialist themes, was proclaimed a national hero in the Azerbaijan Soviet Socialist Republic; Bunyadov, within this context, claimed that "Babak was a national hero of Azerbaijani people". The Russian ethnologist, historian and anthropologist Victor Schnirelmann dismisses Bunyadov's theory, criticizing Bunyadov for not mentioning that Babak spoke Persian, and ignoring the witness accounts of Babak's contemporaries who call him Persian.

Honours and awards
Hero of the Soviet Union
Order of Lenin
Order of the Red Banner
Order of the Red Star
Order of the Patriotic War 1st class
Order of the October Revolution

Selected publications

З. Буниятов. «Азербайджан в VII-IX веках». 1973. Баку
З. Буниятов. «Государство атабеков Азербайджана: 1136-1225». 1984. Баку
Yo'av Karny. Highlanders: A Journey to the Caucasus in Quest of Memory, NY: Farrar, Straus and Giroux, 2001 
Thomas De Waal. Black Garden: Armenia and Azerbaijan Through Peace and War, New York University Press, 2004

References

External links

Short biography in Azerbaijani
In memoriam book by Buniyadov's wife
More on Tahira Bunyadova's book
Arif Yunusov, "Islam in Azerbaijan", 2004
Full biography in Russian
Ziya Bunyadov about participation in World War II

1923 births
1997 deaths
People from Astara District
20th-century Azerbaijani historians
Azerbaijani orientalists
Azerbaijani academics
Heroes of the Soviet Union
Deaths by firearm in Azerbaijan
People murdered in Azerbaijan
Burials at Alley of Honor
Recipients of the Istiglal Order
Translators of the Quran into Azerbaijani
20th-century translators
Recipients of the Order of the Red Banner
Recipients of the Order of Bogdan Khmelnitsky (Soviet Union), 3rd class
Soviet military personnel of World War II from Azerbaijan
Soviet historians
Historical negationism